I Could Be the Only One is a split EP released as a digital single by Manchester Orchestra and Kevin Devine on January 26, 2010. The EP features the artists covering each other's songs, with Manchester Orchestra covering "I Could Be With Anyone" and Devine covering "The Only One".

The songs featured on Spinner.com as the MP3 of the Day on January 25, 2010 along with an article explaining why these songs were chosen. Kevin described "The Only One" as "arguably my favorite", saying that "It's definitely one of the coolest...The charge of it, the way it explodes out at you. The lyric, the circularity of the bridge, the way the phrases fold over each other." Andy Hull described "I Could Be With Anyone" as "...an incredibly real and painfully-depressing song. I've loved this tune since the moment I heard it."

The single was originally planned as a 7" vinyl, but has been indefinitely delayed.

Track listing

References

Manchester Orchestra albums
Kevin Devine EPs
2010 EPs
Split EPs